The 2004 FIA GT Dubai 500 km was the tenth round the 2004 FIA GT Championship season.  It took place at the Dubai Autodrome, United Arab Emirates, on October 8, 2004.

Official results
Class winners in bold.  Cars failing to complete 70% of winner's distance marked as Not Classified (NC).

Statistics
 Pole position – #1 BMS Scuderia Italia – 1:56.182
 Fastest lap – #1 BMS Scuderia Italia – 1:56.936
 Average speed – 158.060 km/h

References

 
 
 

Dubai
Fia Gt Dubai 500km